Sakada (The Tenants, also Seasonal Sugarcane Workers) is a 1976 Philippine social-realist film about the ordeals of sugarcane farmers on the island of Negros in the Philippines. It is "a thinly-veiled criticism of the country's feudal power structure." The film was directed by Behn Cervantes and written by Oscar Miranda (story) and Lualhati Bautista (screenplay). Music was done by Lucio San Pedro. It starred Alicia Alonzo, Robert Arevalo, Hilda Koronel, Pancho Magalona, Bembol Roco, Gloria Romero, Rosa Rosal, and Tony Santos Sr. 

The movie spent three weeks in theaters before Philippine dictator Ferdinand Marcos ordered the military to seize copies of the film. The director was also arrested under the order of Marcos. Sakada was first screened on Philippine television in 2005.

Musical scorer Lutgardo Labad described the film as "a major cinematic coup that unearthed the inhuman conditions of our people then."

Cast
Cast
 
 Alicia Alonzo as Aurora del Mundo
 Robert Arevalo as Salvador "Badong" del Mundo
 Hilda Koronel as Ester del Mundo
 Pancho Magalona as Don Manuel Montemayor
 Bembol Roco as David
 Gloria Romero as Doña Consuelo Montemayor
 Rosa Rosal as Dolores del Mundo
 Tony Santos Sr. as Arsenio "Arsing" del Mundo
 Joseph Sytangco as Juan Miguel Montemayor
 Menggie Cobarrubias as Andres
 Cris Michelena as Alex
 Nena Perez Rubio as Nelia
 Mervyn Samson as Contreras
 Cris Vertido as Father Vic

Plot 
The movie follows the life of Negrense sakadas, or seasonal sugarcane farmers, and the asenderos who own the plantations. Unrest ensues after a sakada is shot to death by one of the plantation's security guards. As the story unfolds, the movie reveals the exploitative feudal agricultural system of the time.

Production 
Sakada was the first film by director Behn Cervantes and scriptwriter Lualhati Bautista. It was filmed under time pressure and budget constraints. As a first-time film director, Cervantes said that he had to deal with technical problems. Time and budget constraints prevented the production from doing reshoots.

Sakada was produced and screened in 1976 while the Philippines was under martial law under Ferdinand Marcos. After Sakada's third week of screening in Philippine cinemas, copies of the film were seized and the director was arrested and detained under the order of Marcos.

After Cervantes' detention, he wrote in a letter to his family dated January 19, 1978, "My movie, Sakada, and my plays, especially the last one, Pagsambang Bayan, show the exploitative nature of this system, the evils the ruling class commit on the many, the need to change the order of things."

Sakada was first shown on television on June 25, 2005, on ABCinema, three decades after prints were seized by the military from movie theaters. ABCinema aimed to feature "only the best local and foreign films that will make the Filipino audience more aware of their culture." In an interview, Cervantes was asked about how young audiences in 2005 could relate to Sakada. He said society's problems "remain the same and most of the time we change leaders but they're the same dogs with different collars."

Reception 
Musical scorer Lutgardo Labad described Sakada as "a major cinematic coup that unearthed the inhuman conditions of our people then."

Film critic Mel Tobias wrote that "any book on Filipino films would be incomplete without mentioning Sakada." He wrote that the film "was a cry to the people and the government to awaken to the serious labor problems in the Philippines. In the process, it stimulated the often infantile movie producers to acknowledge this unorthodox film, made contrary to the traditional formula of Philippine moviemaking." He also praised the performance of the star-studded cast, particularly of Rosa Rosal, "a versatile actress, [who] made a sensational comeback in her portrayal of a sentimental widow. She is driven to become a leader of the sakadas in their fight for reform."

"The film, with its searing focus on the desperate plight of seasonal sugarcane workers, was an eye-opener for most viewers lulled by the martial law era's siren call of 'the true, the good and the beautiful,'" wrote an Inquirer editorial.

Sakada was made at a time of strict censorship, according to Philippine national artist for literature Bienvenido Lumbera, yet "the ingenuity of scriptwriters and directors was able to offer movie-goers works that went beyond entertainment and tackled subject matter with social implications." In the essay "Terror and Culture under Marcos' New Society," Lumbera wrote that Sakada "exposed the abuses and injustices committed by landlords in cahoots with the military in the suppression of the peasant struggle for higher wages and better treatment."

Sakada, in 1981, won a Dekada Award for Best Film of the Decade.

See also 

 Gawad Urian Award
 5th Gawad Urian Awards
 List of films about martial law in the Philippines

References

External links 
 

1976 drama films
Filipino-language films
Philippine historical drama films
Philippine political films
Social realism in film
Films about the labor movement
Films set in Negros Occidental
Films set in Metro Manila
Films about the working class
Films about the upper class
Films about interclass romance